Virgile travesti is a parody of the Aeneid written by Paul Scarron in 1648. This early example of French burlesque literature is notable for introducing the word travesty into English. Produced in eight volumes, the last book in the work was not published until 1659.

References

1648 in France
Works based on the Aeneid
17th-century literature
Satirical books
French poems
Poetry based on works by Virgil